José Luis Dolgetta (born 1 August, 1970) is a retired Venezuelan footballer.

Career statistics

International

International goals
Scores and results list Venezuela's goal tally first.

References

External links
 

1970 births
Living people
Venezuelan footballers
Venezuelan expatriate footballers
Association football forwards
Carabobo F.C. players
Caracas FC players
Estudiantes de Mérida players
Estudiantes de La Plata footballers
Venezuelan expatriate sportspeople in Argentina
Expatriate footballers in Argentina
Venezuelan expatriate sportspeople in Ecuador
Expatriate footballers in Ecuador
Venezuela international footballers
Sportspeople from Valencia, Venezuela
Carabobo F.C. managers
Yaracuyanos F.C. managers
Deportivo Anzoátegui managers